Narayan Prasad Khatiwada is a Nepali communist politician and a member of the House of Representatives of the federal parliament of Nepal. He was elected from Nuwakot-2 constituency, representing CPN UML of the left alliance, by defeating his nearest rival, senior Nepali Congress leader Arjun Narsingh KC, by more than 10,000 votes.

He had previously contested the second constituent assembly election in 2013 from Nuwakot-3 constituency.

References

Living people
Place of birth missing (living people)
21st-century Nepalese people
People from Nuwakot District
Nepal Communist Party (NCP) politicians
Communist Party of Nepal (Unified Marxist–Leninist) politicians
Nepal MPs 2017–2022
1957 births